The Densuș Church (also known as St Nicholas' Church) in the village of Densuș, Hunedoara County is the oldest stone church in Romania.

It was built in its present form in the 13th century on the site of a 2nd-century Roman temple, with some materials from Ulpia Traiana Sarmizegetusa fortress, the capital of Roman Dacia, also known as Dacia Traiana or Dacia Felix. It has a stone tower above the naos. Inside the church there are 15th century mural paintings that show Jesus wearing Romanian traditional clothes. These paintings were made by artist Ștefan. In the 18th century more paintings were added by Simion de Pitești.

From 1566 to the end of the 19th century the building functioned as a Calvinist church, too. Because of this, the paintings were lime-whited in the 16th century and its belltower has a Hungarian inscription from 1782.

According to Romanian historians, on the setting of the present-day church  there was once a Dacian temple dedicated to Zamolxis, upon which the conquering Romans built a temple dedicated to the god Mars. Its present form dates from the beginning of the 12th century. Considering its antecedents, though, Densuș Church dates from the 4th century AD, and is considered the oldest church in Romania and Southeast Europe.

Hypothesis about Densuș 

One of the hypotheses about Densuș is that it was once a pagan temple; to sustain this argument, it is noted that the altar of the church is closer to the South than to the East, which would suggest that it was once a pagan temple, since all early Christian houses of worship have the altar pointing towards the East. Other clues are the form of the roof, which, seen from a lateral perspective, has the form of a bird, to be exact a dove, and above the altar there are two stone lions, united by their tails. Another hypothesis, based on inscriptions found inside the church, holds that it was originally built as a mausoleum to the Roman general Longinus Maximus. But it is also possible that the stones with the inscriptions were moved from their original place and were built into the temple later.

The most widespread opinion among Romanian historians is that the present Densuș church was once a Christianized Roman temple, which is to say a Paleo-Christian church from the 4th to 6th centuries AD, and it is also the first church on Dacian territory.

References

External links
 
 
 
 

Romanian Orthodox churches in Hunedoara County
Buildings and structures in Hunedoara County
Historic monuments in Hunedoara County
13th-century Eastern Orthodox church buildings